Mecinus is a genus of true weevils in the family of beetles known as Curculionidae. There are at least 90 described species in Mecinus.

Species
These 95 species belong to the genus Mecinus:

 Mecinus aestivus Caldara, 2001 c
 Mecinus albipubens Reitter, 1907 c
 Mecinus alboscutellatus Caldara, 2001 c
 Mecinus alpinus Hustache, 1941 c
 Mecinus alternans Kirsch, 1870 c
 Mecinus andalusicus Faust, 1890 c
 Mecinus angustatus Desbrochers, 1893 c
 Mecinus aubei Desbrochers, 1893 c
 Mecinus barbarus Gyllenhal, 1838 c
 Mecinus bonnairei Caldara, 2001 c
 Mecinus brevithorax Desbrochers, 1893 c
 Mecinus bulgaricus Angelov, 1971 c
 Mecinus caucasicus Caldara, 2001 c
 Mecinus cerasi c
 Mecinus circulatus Stephens, 1829 c
 Mecinus collaris Dejean, 1821 c
 Mecinus comosus Boheman, 1845 c
 Mecinus concavirostris Caldara, 2001 c
 Mecinus corifoliae Tosevski & Jovic, 2014 c g
 Mecinus crassifemur Caldara, 2001 c
 Mecinus cuprifer Dejean, 1821 c
 Mecinus curvirostris Petri, 1926 c
 Mecinus desertorum Caldara, 2001 c
 Mecinus dorsalis Aubé, 1850 c
 Mecinus echinatus Desbrochers, 1893 c
 Mecinus elongatus Caldara, 2001 c
 Mecinus erythrocerus Abeille, 1910 c
 Mecinus erythrocnemus Abeille de Perrin, 1910 c
 Mecinus fairmairei Tournier, 1873 c
 Mecinus favarcqi Pic, 1915 c
 Mecinus filiformis Aubé, 1850 c
 Mecinus fimbriatus Germar, E.F., 1821 c
 Mecinus haemorrhoidalis Stephens, 1831 c
 Mecinus hariolus Reitter, 1907 c
 Mecinus henrici Caldara, 2001 c
 Mecinus hesteticus Vitale, 1906 c
 Mecinus heydeni Wencker, 1866 c
 Mecinus horridulus Desbrochers, 1893 c
 Mecinus humeralis Tournier, 1873 c
 Mecinus ianthinus Germar, 1821 g
 Mecinus ictericus Caldara, 2001 c
 Mecinus janthiniformis Tosevski & Caldara in Tosevski, Caldara, Jovic, Hernández-Vera, baviera, Gassmann & Emerson, 2011 c
 Mecinus janthinus Thomson, 1865 c g b (stem-boring weevil)
 Mecinus kaemmereri Wagner, 1927 g
 Mecinus kämmereri Wagner, 1927 c
 Mecinus labilis (Herbst, J.F.W., 1795) c g
 Mecinus laeviceps Tournier, 1873 c g
 Mecinus latiusculus Caldara, 2001 c
 Mecinus limbatus Dejean, 1821 c
 Mecinus lineicollis Reitter, 1907 c
 Mecinus linnavuorii Caldara, 2001 c
 Mecinus longirostris Caldara, 2001 c
 Mecinus longiusculus Boheman, 1845 c
 Mecinus longulus Caldara, 2001 c g
 Mecinus ludyi Caldara, 2001 c g
 Mecinus marginatus Germar, E.F., 1821 c
 Mecinus marina Caldara, 2001 c
 Mecinus marmota Caldara, 2001 c
 Mecinus meridionalis Tosevski & Jovic, 2014 c g
 Mecinus nasutus Tournier, 1873 c
 Mecinus nigronotatus Caldara, 2001 c
 Mecinus paratychioides Caldara, 2001 c
 Mecinus pascuorum (Gyllenhal, 1813) c b
 Mecinus peterharrisi Tosevski & Caldara, 2014 c g
 Mecinus pici Reitter, 1907 c
 Mecinus pinastri Dejean, 1821 c
 Mecinus pipistrellus Caldara, 2001 c
 Mecinus pirazzolii Caldara, 2001 c
 Mecinus plantaginis Caldara, 2001 c
 Mecinus pyraster (Herbst, 1795) i c g b (stem miner weevil)
 Mecinus raphaelis Baviera & Caldara, 2014 c g
 Mecinus reichei Tournier, 1873 c
 Mecinus rufipennis Pic, 1915 c
 Mecinus sanctus Caldara, 2001 c
 Mecinus schneideri Kirsch, 1870 c
 Mecinus semicylindricus Dejean, 1821 c
 Mecinus seriatus Caldara, 2001 c
 Mecinus setosus Kiesenwetter, 1864 c
 Mecinus setulosus Pic, 1896 c
 Mecinus sicardi Hustache, 1920 c
 Mecinus simus Caldara, 2001 c
 Mecinus subcylindricus Pic, 1896 c
 Mecinus sublineellus Fairmaire, 1880 c
 Mecinus suturalis Reitter, 1907 c
 Mecinus tanaiticus Arzanov, 2000 c
 Mecinus tavaresi Hoffmann, 1958 c
 Mecinus teretiusculus Boheman, 1845 c
 Mecinus theresae Reitter, 1907 c
 Mecinus tournieri Fairmaire, 1876 c
 Mecinus tychioides Caldara, 2001 c
 Mecinus variabilis Caldara, 2001 c
 Mecinus variegatus Sturm, 1826 c
 Mecinus venturensis Hoffmann, 1958 c
 Mecinus violaceus Dejean, 1821 c
 Mecinus zherichini Caldara, 2001 c

Data sources: i = ITIS, c = Catalogue of Life, g = GBIF, b = Bugguide.net

References

Further reading

External links

 

Curculioninae